Chaudoirella reichardti is a species of beetle in the family Carabidae, the only species in the genus Chaudoirella.

References

Dryptinae